The 2006–07 Long Beach State 49ers men's basketball team represented California State University, Long Beach during the 2006–07 NCAA Division I men's basketball season. The 49ers, led by fifth year head coach Larry Reynolds, played their home games at Walter Pyramid and were members of the Big West Conference.  They finished the season 24–8, 12–2 in Big West play to be crowned regular season champions. They were also champions of the Big West Basketball tournament to earn the conference's automatic bid into the 2007 NCAA tournament where they lost in the opening round to Tennessee.

Roster

Schedule and results

|-
!colspan=9 style=| Regular season

|-
!colspan=9 style=| Big West Conference Tournament

|-
!colspan=9 style=| NCAA Tournament

Source

References

Long Beach State Beach men's basketball seasons
Long Beach
Long Beach
Long Beach State 49ers men's basketball
Long Beach State 49ers men's basketball